Enstrom or Enström is a Swedish surname. Notable people with the surname include:

People 

 Axel Fredrik Enström (1875–1948), Swedish engineer
 Axel Enström (1893–1977), Swedish industrialist
 James Enstrom (1943-present), American epidemiologist
 Karin Enström (born 1966), Swedish politician
 Eric Enstrom, photographer
 Tina Enström (born March 23, 1991), ice hockey player
 Tobias Enström (born November 5, 1984), ice hockey player

Other uses 
 Enstrom Helicopter Corporation, makers of several small helicopter designs
 Enstrom Township, Roseau County, Minnesota

See also 
 Engström, surnames
 Eneström, surname